Stringtown is an unincorporated community in Butler County, in the U.S. state of Missouri.

The community is on Missouri Route M one mile east of  Beaverdam Creek.

According to tradition, Stringtown was named for the "string" or line of customers to a local bootleg liquor outlet.

References

Unincorporated communities in Butler County, Missouri
Unincorporated communities in Missouri